Lena el-Sheikh Omer Majhoub (also: Lina, al-Sheikh, Elsheikh) became the Sudanese Minister of Labour (or Welfare) and Social Development in early September 2019 in the Transitional Cabinet of Prime Minister Abdalla Hamdok, during the 2019 Sudanese transition to democracy.

Education
El-Sheikh obtained her master's degree in development studies at the University of Manchester and a BSc degree at Ahfad University for Women.

Academia and management
El-Sheikh became an academic staff member of the School of Management Studies at the Ahfad University for Women in 2002.  El-Sheikh is interested in promoting corporate social responsibility. She is a co-founder of the Impact Hub Khartoum website, which aims to provide "a cooperative environment for entrepreneurs, intellectuals and innovators". At Impact Hub Khartoum, el-Sheikh holds the title of Head of Community Programs and aims to support sustainable development.

Minister of Labour (or Welfare) and Social Development
In early September 2019, el-Sheikh became the Sudanese Minister of Labour (or Welfare) and Social Development in the Transitional Cabinet of Prime Minister Abdalla Hamdok, during the 2019 Sudanese transition to democracy. Other women leaders of Sudan during the transitional period include Chief Justice Nemat Abdullah Khair, and Sovereignty Council members Aisha Musa el-Said and Raja Nicola.

References

Government ministers of Sudan
Women government ministers of Sudan
Living people
People of the Sudanese Revolution
21st-century Sudanese women politicians
21st-century Sudanese politicians
Alumni of the University of Manchester
Year of birth missing (living people)
Ahfad University for Women alumni